Zongping Township is a township in Daozhen Gelao and Miao Autonomous County, Guizhou, China.

Administrative division
As of 2016, the township is divided into five villages: 
 Shengli
 Cangpuxi
 Zhaoshan
 Wenlian
 Sili

Economy
The economy of the township is supported primarily by farming, ranching and mineral resources. There are 4 million tons of coal resources in the township. Marble reserves reach .

References

Bibliography

Townships of Zunyi